"Just Can't Get Enough" is a song by American group the Black Eyed Peas. The song was written by members will.i.am, apl.de.ap, Taboo and Fergie, along with Joshua Alvarez, Stephen Shadowen, Rodney "Darkchild" Jerkins, and Julie Frost, for the group's sixth studio album, The Beginning (2010). It was announced on January 21, 2011, as the album's second single.

The song has been a success on the charts, reaching the top-five in many countries, such as New Zealand (their twelfth top 5), Australia, Greece, France, United Kingdom and the United States, among others. The video for this song was filmed in Japan a week before the 2011 Tōhoku earthquake and tsunami happened.
As of June 2011, the single has sold more than 2,462,000 digital units in the US.

Background and composition
The Beginnings second single was announced on the Black Eyed Peas' official website on January 21, 2011.

Rodney Jerkins and Julie Frost composed the basic song together, with Jerkins on piano and Frost contributing the lyrics and topline melody. The Darkchild production team of Tommy Brown and Bah then worked on the producing the track and contributing to the music composition before will.i.am and the Black Eyed Peas, in the words of Frost, "cut it up and gave it their own twist".

Member apl.de.ap told Beatweek Magazine that he wanted the song to be the follow-up to "The Time (Dirty Bit)", because "It's a different tempo and it's also paying homage to the ladies."

Group member Taboo explained the meaning of the song to MTV News as: "The message is knowing that when you're gone from somebody, especially when you're on tour, you can't get enough of them or you're just thinking about them and you just want to let them know that you're always there for them."

Critical reception
Andy Gill from The Independent said, positively, that: "other highlights include "Just Can't Get Enough" – not the Depeche Mode song – which vaults suddenly from the rare dignity of string-synth textures to a sweatily pumping techno finale". Lewis Corner from Digital Spy rated it three stars (out of five) and commented that: "The back-and-forth production – reminiscent of vintage arcade game Pong – comprises electronic synths and soft strings teamed with heavy beats and, of course, the obligatory vocoded 'mega switch up' – prompting its transformation into a thumping techno endgame. Throw in some 'LOL' text lingo and computerised vocals, and we can't help but think he's perhaps spent a little too much time in front of the PC for this one. You want to be careful Will, we hear they make your eyes go square".

Music video
The music video for "Just Can't Get Enough" was directed by Ben Mor. It was shot over a three-day period in Tokyo, Japan primarily in the Ginza and Shibuya districts while the group was on a press tour. The opening clips show shots of the Ginza district. The video was shot between March 3–5, 2011, just one week before the 2011 Tōhoku earthquake and tsunami. In an interview with Entertainment Tonight, Fergie spoke of the clip and the natural disaster in Japan, saying, "It was the easiest video I ever shot because it was us living our lives. I love that it's showing a true perspective of how it can sometimes be lonely on the road away from our loved ones. It also demonstrates the love and connection we have with Japan. Our heart goes out to all of the Japanese people who have been affected by this natural disaster." Taboo was also quoted saying "It was an amazing moment in time because Japan has always been my favorite place on the planet. It was great to do our video there. God bless the Japanese. Our love goes out to them."

The video premiered on March 16, 2011, on music video website Vevo. It opens with the translator voice tells the caption "This video was filmed in Japan one week before the earthquake and tsunami. Our thoughts and prayers go out to all the people of Japan. We love you." It was shot in a guerrilla-style. Fergie is seen overlooking the city from her suite in The Peninsula Tokyo, will.i.am is in the back of a car. Taboo sings his verse while walking in the Shibuya district and apl.de.ap sings his "switched up" verse in front of a futuristic backdrop with flashing lights. It also includes vignettes of Tokyo's nightlife, such as young club-goers taking photos with mobile phones and the city's rail system. At a couple points, it shows all four members wearing different styles of sunglasses and dressed in black performing at a nightclub. The clip closes with the translator voice with a message to encourage viewers to donate to the Red Cross.

The video received positive reviews from critics. Bill Lamb of About.com wrote that "The feel ... was already a bit melancholy depicting the loneliness and separation of being on the road. However, the fact that the clip was filmed in Tokyo, Japan just a week before the recent devastating earthquake gives the video even more depth and poignance." Becky Bain of Idolator wrote that "It's basically Lost in Translation with a more thumping soundtrack."

Live performances
The Black Eyed Peas performed the song for the first time on the tenth season of American Idol on March 17, 2011. The performance began with will.i.am, wearing a white suit and playing on the piano and dedicating the song to Japan. Fergie then opened the song while sitting atop the piano wearing a white halter dress. Later, will.i.am stood up and joined her on stage to sing his lines. apl.de.ap and Taboo, also wearing white clothing, sang and rapped along. Behind them, string players and dancers performed, and couples acted out skits. Near the end, the group jumped around on stage, while encouraging the audience to dance and clap along. They also performed "Just Can't Get Enough" at the Nickelodeon Kids' Choice Awards 2011 and in the show that they performed for MTV World Stage. on December 11, 2019, They again performed "Just Can't Get Enough" at the closing ceremony of the 2019 Southeast Asian Games at the New Clark City Athletics Stadium in Philippines.

Track listing
 Digital download
 "Just Can't Get Enough" – 3:40

 German CD single
 "Just Can't Get Enough" – 3:40
 "Just Can't Get Enough" (Instrumental) – 3:48

 French CD single
 "Just Can't Get Enough" – 3:40
 "The Time (Dirty Bit)" (Zedd remix) – 6:00

Credits and personnel
 Vocals – will.i.am, apl.de.ap, Taboo, Fergie
 Songwriting – will.i.am, apl.de.ap, Taboo, Fergie, Joshua Alvarez, Stephen Shadowen, Rodney Jerkins, Julie Frost
 Production – will.i.am, DJ Ammo, Rodney "Darkchild" Jerkins
 Conducting & Arrangement – Larry Gold
 Violins – Emma Kummrow, Olga Konopelsky, Gislaine Fleischmann, Charles Parker, Michelle Bishop, Gregory Teperman, Tamae Lee & Erica Miller
 Violas – Davis Barnett & Ruth Frazier
 Cello – Jennie Lorenzo Tom Kraines
 Drum programming, Fender Rhodes, synthesizers, Moog Bass – will.i.am
 Drum programming, synthesizers – Dj Ammo

Source:

Charts

Weekly charts

Year-end charts

Certifications

Release history

References

2010 songs
2011 singles
Black Eyed Peas songs
Interscope Records singles
Number-one singles in France
Number-one singles in Poland
Song recordings produced by Rodney Jerkins
Songs written by Rodney Jerkins
Song recordings produced by will.i.am
Songs written by will.i.am
Songs written by Julie Frost
Songs written by Fergie (singer)
Songs written by apl.de.ap
Torch songs